Facundo Mariano Núñez Techera (born 24 February 2006) is a Uruguayan professional footballer who plays as a forward for Primera División club Cerro Largo.

Career
A former youth academy player of Liverpool de Canelones, Núñez joined Cerro Largo in 2021. He made his professional debut on 14 April 2021 in a 4–1 Copa Sudamericana defeat against Peñarol. Aged 15 years and 49 days, this made him the youngest player in tournament's history.

Personal life
Facundo is younger brother of professional footballer and current teammate Carlos Núñez.

Career statistics

References

External links
 

2006 births
Living people
People from Canelones Department
Association football forwards
Uruguayan footballers
Cerro Largo F.C. players